Martin Miguel Mangay del Rosario (born November 25, 1992) is a Filipino actor and model who is known for his portrayal of Norberto Matias in the 2011 drama series Minsan Lang Kita Iibigin, as Severino Monzon in the TV adaptation of Pintada in 2012, and as Nico in the 2016 film  Ang Manananggal sa Unit 23B.

Del Rosario received his first award as an actor in 2011 from the film Dagim naming him as the Breakthrough Performance by An Actor by the Entertainment Press Society for his role as Jun. He was also awarded, the same year, as the New Movie Actor of the Year by the Philippine Movie Press Club. In 2015, he won as Best Supporting Actor at the Gawad Urian Awards for his role as Gab in the 2014 Cinemalaya film, Dagitab.

On September 2, 2014, after six years of being a talent of ABS-CBN under Star Magic, del Rosario signed an exclusive contract with GMA Network. Prior to this, del Rosario was already seen in most of GMA Network shows such as Rhodora X and Magpakailanman.

Early and personal life
Del Rosario was born on November 25, 1992, to Robert del Rosario, a landscape artist who had a small stint in show business in his early years, and Maria Teresa "Tet" Mangay, a company executive and the sister of character actress Ces Quesada. He finished his high school studies as salutatorian in Lourdes School of Quezon City. He took up BA Broadcast Communication at the University of the Philippines Diliman, and was a member of the Upsilon Sigma Phi fraternity.

He is the middle child of three siblings with Kim being the eldest and Denise being the youngest. He is a nephew of broadcast journalist Connie Sison.

Career

Early years
Del Rosario was in his second year high school when he was spotted by talent scout Jun Reyes, who was in a cab, in front of Lourdes School in 2007. He was on his way La Loma to buy lechon for Gerald Anderson's birthday party when Del Rosario caught his attention. Reyes left him a calling card and asked for his phone number. Del Rosario gave Reyes his mom's phone number. He then went to ABS-CBN for acting workshops.

2007–2013
His first television role was playing Ray Avellino in Star Magic Presents: Abt Ur Luv. He also played the younger brother of Roxanne Guinoo in Sineserye Presents: Natutulog Ba ang Diyos? in the same year.

When Star Magic Presents: Abt Ur Luv Ur Lyf 2 ended in 2008, he appeared in another two seasons of Star Magic Presents namely: Astigs in Haay...skul lyf and Astigs in Luvin' Lyf. He appeared in three episodes of Maalaala Mo Kaya in 2008. He also landed a supporting role in ABS-CBN's prime time drama Iisa Pa Lamang.

In 2009, he played a molested teenager in the "Boarding House" episode of Maalaala Mo Kaya. He was cast as Otap, the main antagonist, of Your Song Presents: Boystown. He then went on to appear in two more episodes of Maalaala Mo Kaya in the same year. He also had a special participation in May Bukas Pa and a supporting role in Katorse.

Del Rosario made his film debut in 2010. He had a supporting role in Star Cinema's Till My Heartaches End and a lead role in the indie film Dagim. According to del Rosario, his first film was Dagim but Till My Heartaches End came out in cinemas earlier. In television, he appeared in the afternoon drama series Magkano ang Iyong Dangal? and Juanita Banana. He also portrayed gay roles in the "Headband" episode of Maalaala Mo Kaya and in the horror-fantasy drama TV series Rosalka.

In 2011, Del Rosario made a cameo appearance in the 2010 remake of Mara Clara and was cast as Norberto Matias in Minsan Lang Kita Iibigin. While filming a fight scene in Minsan Lang Kita Iibigin, Del Rosario accidentally shot Andi Eigenmann with a blank bullet. Eigenmann was rushed to the St. Luke's Medical Center in Quezon City. The actress suffered second degree burns. Del Rosario later apologized for the accident. He received his first acting award in the same year. He won "Breakthrough Performance by an Actor" for the film Dagim in the 8th Golden Screen Awards presented by the Entertainment Press Society, Inc. He also won the "New Movie Actor of the Year" award, for the same film, in the 27th PMPC Star Awards for Movies. He played Ulam the brother of Pura, played by Melai Cantiveros, in the film The Adventures of Pureza, directed by Soxie Topacio.

In 2012, he was the lead actor of Precious Hearts Romances Presents: Pintada, together with Denise Laurel. It was directed by Cathy Garcia Molina.

2014–present
Del Rosario was first seen on GMA Network as Martin Aquino in the psychological drama series Rhodora X, this is after he was released by his previous network ABS-CBN. On September 2, 2014, along with Camille Prats and Kiko Estrada, Del Rosario officially inked an exclusive contract with GMA Network. In 2015, Del Rosario appeared in afternoon drama series Buena Familia. He had a guest appearance in the primetime series Pari 'Koy as the gay lover of Sam Evangelista, Jr. played by Hiro Peralta and in Beautiful Strangers as Oliver Lacsamana.

In 2016, del Rosario became part of the cast of Dangwa as Miguel in its last two weeks. The same year, he starred as Caloy Manalastas in the political-drama series Naku, Boss Ko! with Ruru Madrid and Gabbi Garcia. 

In 2018, he landed a regular role in the GMA's new hit series Hindi Ko Kayang Iwan Ka alongside Mike Tan, Yasmien Kurdi and Jackie Rice.

Filmography

Television

Film

Accolades

References

External links
 

1992 births
Living people
ABS-CBN personalities
Star Magic
Filipino male voice actors
Filipino male television actors
Filipino male models
GMA Network personalities
University of the Philippines Diliman alumni
Filipino male film actors